The Grand Casino opened in 1999 in the city of Dunedin in New Zealand. Originally named the Grand Hotel was built in 1883 by Italian architect Louis Boldini. The interior finishing showcases the Victorian taste in classical architecture. 

The Dunedin Casinos Charitable Trust has granted a total of $62,900 to 45 recipients in the November 2019. Major recipients include the Cancer Society and Otago Community Hospice.

See also
Gambling in New Zealand

References

External links
Grand Casino

Casinos completed in 1999
Casinos in New Zealand
Buildings and structures in Dunedin
Tourist attractions in Dunedin
1999 establishments in New Zealand
Central Dunedin